Rosetta Stone Language Learning is proprietary, computer-assisted language learning (CALL) software published by Rosetta Stone Inc, part of the IXL Learning family of products. The software uses images, text, and sound to teach words and grammar by spaced repetition, without translation. Rosetta Stone calls its approach Dynamic Immersion.

The software's name and logo allude to the ancient stone slab of the same name on which the Decree of Memphis is inscribed in three writing systems.

IXL Learning acquired Rosetta Stone in March 2021.

Dynamic Immersion
In a Rosetta Stone Language Learning exercise, the learner pairs sound or text to one of several images. The number of images per screen varies.

For example, the software shows the learner four photographs. A native speaker makes a statement that describes one of the photographs, and the statement is printed on the screen; the learner chooses the photograph that the speaker described. In another variation, the learner completes a textual description of a photograph.

In writing exercises, the software provides an on-screen keyboard for the user to type characters that are not in the Latin alphabet or accents that may not be in their native language.

Grammar lessons cover grammatical tense and grammatical mood. In grammar lessons, the program firstly shows the learner several examples of a grammatical concept, and in some levels, the word or words the learner should focus on are highlighted. Then the learner is given a sentence with several options for a word or phrase, and the learner chooses the correct option.

If the learner has a microphone, the software will evaluate word pronunciation using the embedded speech recognition engine, TrueAccent.

Each unit contains reviews of the content in those lessons, and each unit concludes with a Milestone activity, which is a simulated conversation that covers the content of the unit.

Scoring
The program immediately informs whether the answer is right or wrong. Through the Preferences screen, the learner can choose whether a sound is played or not when an answer is clicked. At the bottom of the window, the program shows all the screens for the current lesson. If all answers for that screen are correct, the button for that screen turns green. If some answers are correct, the border of the button turns green, but the screen number itself turns orange. If all answers for a screen are wrong, the button turns orange. This applies to all lessons except review and Milestone lessons, which are treated as tests. In those lessons, the buttons for each screen all remain clear. In all lessons, there is a button that can be hovered over to display how many answers are correct, incorrect, or have not been answered. Each time an answer is clicked, one point is given. At the end of the lesson, the total number of correct, wrong or skipped answers is shown alongside the percentage of correct answers for that lesson. If too many questions were answered incorrectly, the program suggests the learner should retry the lesson.

Software versions
To use Rosetta Stone Language Learning, a student needs the Rosetta Stone application software and at least one level of a language pack. The latest major version of Rosetta Stone is Rosetta Stone Language Learning 5.0.13.

Language packs also have version numbers. The version number of the language pack is distinct from the version numbering scheme of the Rosetta Stone application, and a language pack is only compatible with specific versions of the application. Version 4 and 5 are backward compatible with language packs developed for Version 3, but not older ones.

Version 1
By the end of 1996, Rosetta Stone Version 1 had a selection of nine level-one language courses (Dutch, English, French, German, Italian, Mandarin Chinese, Portuguese, Russian, Spanish) and four level-two courses (English, French, German, Spanish). A CD-ROM product called The Rosetta Stone PowerPac featured introductory versions of seven of the courses.

At this time, Fairfield Language Technologies had already begun development of the Arabic, Esperanto, Hebrew, Indonesian, Japanese, Korean, Swahili, Thai, and Vietnamese courses. Within a few months, the Japanese, Thai, and Vietnamese courses were complete, and development of Latin, Polish, and Welsh courses were underway. The Latin course was the next to be completed, followed by Hebrew. In this fashion, Fairfield introduced new courses to market gradually.

Rosetta Stone Version 1 was developed for Macintosh System 6 and higher, and Windows 3.0 and higher. Later revisions of Version 1 for Macintosh required System 7. The final revision of Version 1 was v1.9.

Version 2
At Version 2, Fairfield continued to add more language courses, but also marketed more editions of The Rosetta Stone software.

The PowerPac CD-ROM introduced in Version 1 now featured basic lessons in seven languages. One complete level of a language course was now called a Personal Edition of the software.

Because many consumers found The Rosetta Stone to be too expensive, Fairfield started a series of "Explorer" editions. An Explorer CD-ROM was a lower-cost excerpt of a Version 2 course. Each edition of the Rosetta Stone Explorer series (Japanese Explorer, Welsh Explorer, etc.) included three units (22 lessons) from Level 1. The company no longer sells Explorer editions.

Then there was Global Traveler, a CD-ROM and electronic translation dictionary package for people requiring some facility in English, French, Spanish, Italian, or German. The lessons on the CD-ROM teach words and phrases for travelers. The electronic translator was programmed with about 60,000 words and 720 phrases.

Compatibility
The Rosetta Stone v2.0.x is backward compatible with some of the later language packs for Version 1; specifically languages courses with a version number of 3.0 or 4.0.x.

The Rosetta Stone v2.1 through v2.2.x are only compatible with v6.x language courses. These versions of the language packs and software engine are neither backward compatible nor forward compatible. Language discs developed for The Rosetta Stone v2.0.x are incompatible with these later revisions of the software.

In v2.1.4.1A of The Rosetta Stone, the program began using copy protection software called SafeDisc.

Version 3
Rosetta Stone Version 3 is not backward compatible with language packs developed for Rosetta Stone Versions 1 or 2.

Version 3 was initially released in August 2007 for ten bestselling languages, with other languages following later on. The final revision of Version 3 is v3.4.7.r1.

Homeschool Edition
Homeschool Edition introduces additional features that keep track of time spent per lesson, scores achieved on lessons, lesson plans, and instructional objectives. This edition includes a supplemental CD-ROM that has workbooks, quizzes, lesson transcripts, and exams.

Unlike the Personal Edition, the Homeschool Edition application does not recommend reviews. Aside from the minor differences, the homeschool edition is essentially the same as the personal edition—except for the supplemental CD with written exercises and lesson plans. The language discs in the two editions are identical and are interchangeable. Some may have 3 discs and some may have 5. Much of the information on the supplemental CD-ROM is available online from Rosetta Stone.

Version 4 TOTALe
Version 4 is backward compatible with all language packs developed for Version 3.

Rosetta Stone released Version 4 TOTALe on September 14, 2010. TOTALe is a software suite comprising Rosetta Course, Rosetta Studio, Rosetta World, and TOTALe Mobile Companion. Users of the Rosetta Studio software subscribe to a service that videoconferences them with a language coach. Rosetta World is a social gaming service. TOTALe Mobile Companion is a Rosetta Stone mobile app for iOS and Android devices.

With Version 4, Rosetta Stone adds stricter copy protection measures.

Rosetta Stone Language Learning 5.0.13 
Rosetta Stone released Version 5 on October 9, 2014. The notable changes are the change in brand name ("Rosetta Course" has become "Language Training"), a new interactive demo is built into the application based on user feedback and a new minimalist UI with no beveled edges or drop shadows.

The software is offered in three variants

Rosetta Stone Language Learning CD-ROM
 The core Language Training lessons, up to five levels for certain languages in CDs.
 Audio Companion CDs that supplement your Course lessons. These can be played on CD or MP3 players.
 A USB headset with microphone that is configured for speech recognition technology.
 A three-month trial of Online Subscription.
 the software can be installed on up to 2 computers, for use by up to 5 household members.

Rosetta Stone Language Learning Download
 The core Language Training lessons, up to five levels for certain languages.
 Instant download (language packs in rsd format) right after the purchase.
 A three-month trial of Online Subscription. 
 it can be installed on up to 2 computers, for use by up to 5 household members.

Online Subscription
 Full access to all Language Training levels for your respective language.
 Games & Community.
 Mobile Apps: Full access to apps no matter what flavor you prefer: Language Companion, Language Training, and Live Tutoring.
 Access to Online features is limited to one user age 13 and up.
 A constant internet connection is required.

Discover Languages 

Rosetta Stone's Discover Languages is an app currently only available on Xbox One. It is very different from the traditional design, involving a virtual world and more of a focus on games in order to appeal more strongly to game playing audiences. The only languages currently supported are English and Spanish.

Language courses
, there are 28 Language Training courses offered by Rosetta. Each language course requires either its own language pack, offered through CD-ROMs or downloads, or online subscription.

  Modern Standard Arabic is a literary language used in the Middle East and north Africa, but it is not a spoken language. See also varieties of Arabic.
  Modern Hebrew is taught, not Biblical Hebrew.

  Discontinued languages

Course organization
The language courses are divided into three to five levels offered as language packs either in CD-ROMs or Download. In the retail software packages of Rosetta Stone, each CD-ROM has one level.

All languages, except Latin, use mostly the same set of words and sentences in almost the same order, with mainly the same images. Some of the material is reused from lesson to lesson to invoke long-term retention.

In version 3 pack, there are four units per language level. Each unit has four core lessons that are about 30 minutes long. The student then moves on to one of the following lesson modes: Pronunciation, Writing, Vocabulary, Grammar, Listening, Reading, Speaking. The Milestone is an exercise at the end of each unit in which students apply what they learned in the unit.

Audio Companion
On 9 June 2008, Rosetta Stone introduced an addition to its Version 3 product line: Audio Companion, supplemental audio recordings of words and phrases. The student is meant to repeat the spoken words and phrases for practice and memorization. Unlike recordings based on the Pimsleur method, the Audio Companion provides neither narration nor translations. Rosetta Stone distributes the audio supplements on audio CD and as MP3 files. Each Audio Companion supplements one level of the language course, and each disc supplements a specific unit. Complete Version 4 course packages include Audio Companion material for each level.

Endangered Language Program
The Endangered Language Program was created in 2004 for use by endangered language communities engaged in language revitalization.

Organizations that contract the Endangered Language Program to develop custom software own the sales and distribution rights over their final product, allowing communities control over this language resource and respecting indigenous intellectual property rights. These versions are thus not marketed via the usual outlets such as bookstores or commercial websites.

Based in Harrisonburg, Virginia, the Endangered Language Program began offering a corporate grant program in 2007 to underwrite development costs for awarded communities. Rosetta Stone Inc. offered the first awards of the grant program to the Chitimacha Tribe of Louisiana and the Navajo Language Renaissance coalition.

The Endangered Language Program also offers paid internships to graduate and undergraduate students interested in contributing to the work of the program.

In November 2015 the Chickasaw Nation, through the Chickasaw Language Revitalization Program established in 2007, contracted with Rosetta Stone to customize language learning content to preserve and introduce the Chickasaw language to its 60,000+ members worldwide.  This effort comes as the Chickasaw Nation has approximately 50 native speakers remaining, with its last monolingual speaker having died in 2013.

Reception and efficacy

Critiques from language experts
Frequent criticism of the program arises in its lack of sensitivity to the differences between the various languages it comes in and their respective cultures. Early versions of the software presented the same concepts in the same order, using the same images taken mostly in the Washington, D.C. area near the company's headquarters at the time in Harrisonburg, Virginia. In the most recent version, there have been some modifications to the picture set for certain languages or regions.

Another frequent issue was the use of more formal vocabulary than that regularly used by native speakers. In 2006, Macworld reviewer Cyrus Farivar noted that his Persian CD used khodrow for "car", although most native speakers use a French loanword, ma:sheen (in the same way English speakers would be more likely to say "car" than "automobile" in everyday speech). The same course did not teach words that would be important to someone learning Persian, such as "bread" and "tea"; however, it very curiously included the word "elephant" in a basic vocabulary lesson. Perplexed by the question of why the word "elephant" would be taught in a language where it might never be used (there are not many elephants in Iran), Farivar called Rosetta Stone, Inc. He was told that the company makes four different picture sets: one for Western languages, another for Asian languages, and two sets unique to each Swahili and Latin. The Persian language CD was using the Western picture set, which explains why the images were not culturally relevant.

Donald McRae on the German course
Writing in 1997, Donald McRae of Brock University said that Rosetta Stone represented "good pedagogy" and that "the authors of the program never lose sight of solid teaching methodology". He described the Version 2 German language course as "very good", but indicated that he had "some reservations".

Mark Kaiser on the Russian course
In a 1997 review of the Version 2 Russian language course, Mark Kaiser, director of the Language Media Center at the University of California, Berkeley, called the program "woefully inadequate for a number of reasons".

One of Kaiser's observations was that Rosetta Stone software fails to provide a relevant cultural context. Because the company uses the same stock photographs for all its language courses, they depict people, activities, and manufactured goods that are conspicuously American. Kaiser also found that Rosetta Stone Version 2 does not provide a way for students to evaluate their conversation skills, and that some of the words and phrases are too English-based.

"The entire package lacks any pedagogical foundation," he concluded. "Rather, it utilizes the glitz of the multimedia capabilities of the computer, a dearth of quality foreign language software, and clever marketing to create an economically successful product."

Stephen Krashen's review

The language-learning specialist Stephen Krashen found that the few studies on the software produced learning results that were "about as effective as traditional instruction on traditional tests.

Awards

From the software industry
2021 CODiE award: Best Solution for English as a Second Language
2011 Adobe MAX Honorable Mention, Disruptive Design
 2011 South by Southwest Interactive Awards, Educational Resource
 2010 International CES, Innovation
 2009 Tech Circle Gold Award for Enterprise Software
 2009 Children's Technology Review Editor's Choice Award
 2009 Codie awards, Best Corporate Achievement
 2008–2009 Codie awards, Best Instructional Solution in Other Curriculum Areas
 2008 EDDIE Awards for Best Corporate Learning Solution and Best Instructional Solution in Other Curriculum Areas

From non-profit organisations
 2012 World Affairs Council of Washington, DC Education Award
 2009 Association of Educational Publishers Award
 2011 USDLA International Awards, Excellence in Distance Learning
 2010 USDLA Silver Award, Best Practices in Distance Learning Programming

From magazines
 2011 PCMag.com Editors' Choice Award
 2011 Practical Homeschooling i-Learn Awards, 1st Place in Foreign Language category; Honorable mention in Latin category
 2010 Practical Homeschooling i-Learn Awards, 1st Place in Foreign Language category; 1st Place in Latin category
 2009 Creative Child Media of the Year Award for Educational Media
 2004–2008, Excellence in Education Award for Foreign Language, The Old Schoolhouse
 2004–2006, Homeschool Stamp of Approval for Foreign Language, Homeschooling Parent magazine
 2002–2008, 1st Place in Foreign Language Category, Practical Homeschooling Reader Award

Institutional use

United States Army
In December 2007, the United States Army offered a special military version of Arabic to help troops deploying to the Middle East learn the language for conversations and phrases important in a military situation. It was available to all US Army personnel, US Military Academy cadets, contracted US Army ROTC Cadets and other special guests with a sponsor.

The United States Army "E-Learning", a SkillPort product, offered the full Version 3 Online, with the exception of only a few languages. The Army E-Learning web site was accessible by most Army members with a valid AKO (Army Knowledge Online) e-mail address or CAC (Common Access Card).

Rosetta Stone's Army contract ended on September 24, 2011.

Other branches of the U.S military also offered Rosetta Stone software. The United States Air Force also offers a similar version to company-grade officers. The United States Marine Corps also offers an online version of all the languages that Rosetta Stone offers through their MarineNet Distance Learning portal.

The U.S. Department of State uses Rosetta Stone (Version 3 as of 2009) as a companion to their in-class and distance learning language programs provided through the Foreign Service Institute. It is free for civil and foreign service employees.

James Madison University
In April 2011, James Madison University was the first university to partner with Rosetta Stone to offer the Rosetta Stone Version 4 TOTALe as an accredited Conversational Spanish I language learning course. The program teaches Spanish through a series of images that, when clicked on, show the vocabulary word. The student will speak into a microphone and speech recognition software will correct mispronounced words, according to Reilly Brennan, Rosetta Stone's Director of Public Relations. The course is available to adults who want to complete a degree for teaching and non-degree seeking students are eligible to take the class. The Rosetta Stone TOTALe accredited offering is a 16-week, intensive language-learning program. The program is accessed completely online and follows a syllabus approved by Rosetta Stone and James Madison University.

See also
 Distance education
 Duolingo
 Smigin
 E-learning
 Language education
 Language pedagogy
 List of Language Self-Study Programs
 Tom Adams (entrepreneur)
 Babbel

References

External links
 

Proprietary language learning software
Spaced repetition software
Cross-platform software
MacOS multimedia software
Windows multimedia software
Android (operating system) software